Sviridov, a Russian masculine surname, may refer to:

People 
Egor Sviridov, Russian football fan murdered in 2010 
Evgeni Sviridov (figure skater) (born 1974), Uzbekistani figure skater
Evgeniy Sviridov (bandy) (born 1974), Belarusian bandy player
Evgeny Sviridov (violinist) (born 1989), Russian violinist
Georgy Sviridov (1915–1998), Russian composer
Karp Sviridov (1896–1967), Soviet general
Ruslan Sviridov (born 1973), Russian pianist
Sergey Sviridov (born 1990), Russian decathlete
Valentin Sviridov (born 1967), Russian politician
Vladimir Sviridov (born 1990), Russian Paralympic athlete
Vladimir Petrovich Sviridov (1897–1963), Soviet military commander

Places 
 Sviridov, Kursk Oblast, a khutor in Medvensky District of Kursk Oblast, Russia

See also 
 Sviridova (disambiguation), the feminine counterpart of Sviridov